"1000 Dreams" is a song performed by French recording duo Miss Kittin & The Hacker, taken from their second studio album, Two. It was released in April 2009, as the album's second single by Nobody's Bizzness. "1000 Dreams" became a minor hit in Belgium, where it reached top-twenty on the Flanders Ultratip chart. The song was used to open the 2009-2010 Fall/Winter Dior haute couture collection.

Composition
"1000 Dreams" is credited as a Europop song and is influenced by Depeche Mode, Kraftwerk, Robyn, and Tracey Thorn. The Kraftwerk influences are prominent in the riffs of the song.

Critical reception
Eric Henderson of Slant Magazine gave a critical view of the album Two, yet praised the song, commenting, "Miss Kittin floats on the clouds of '1000 Dreams,' firm in her belief that indulging in myriad rewardless sensations will ultimately prove its own reward."

Chris Todd from Clash placed "1000 Dreams" at number two on the Top 20 Songs of 2009.

Music video
The music video was directed by Régis Brochier of 7th floor Productions in January 2009.

Track listing
Promo - CD single
 "1000 Dreams" (Radio Cut By Kittin) - 3:47
 "1000 Dreams" (Original) - 5:24

Vinyl, 12-inch single
 "1000 Dreams" (Maxime Dangles Remix) - 7:28	 
 "1000 Dreams" (Original) - 5:23	
 "1000 Dreams" (Instrumental) - 5:27

Charts

Release history

References

2009 songs
2009 singles
Miss Kittin songs
Electroclash songs
Songs written by Miss Kittin